Leiocephalus onaneyi, commonly known as the Guantanamo striped curlytail, Guantánamo striped curly-tailed lizard, or Sierra curlytail lizard, is a species of lizard in the family Leiocephalidae (curly-tailed lizard). It is native to Cuba.

References

Leiocephalus
Reptiles described in 1973
Reptiles of Cuba
Taxa named by Orlando H. Garrido
Endemic fauna of Cuba